The 2015 Hawaii Rainbow Warriors football team represented the University of Hawaii at Mānoa in the 2015 NCAA Division I FBS football season. The team was led by head coach Norm Chow, who was fired after week 10 and replaced by Chris Naeole on an interim basis. They played their home games at Aloha Stadium. They were members of the Mountain West Conference in the West Division. They finished the season 3–10, 0–8 in Mountain West play to finish in last place in the West Division.

On November 27, 2015, Nick Rolovich was hired as the new head football coach at the University of Hawaii replacing Norm Chow.

Schedule

Schedule Source:

Game summaries

Colorado

at Ohio State

The 107,145 in attendance is the largest crowd to ever attend a University of Hawaii football game.

UC Davis

at Wisconsin

at Boise State

San Diego State

at New Mexico

at Nevada

Air Force

at UNLV

Fresno State

San Jose State

Louisiana–Monroe

Depth chart

References

Hawaii
Hawaii Rainbow Warriors football seasons
Hawaii Rainbow Warriors football